Bellinga Castle is situated in Ystad Municipality, Scania,   Sweden.
The mansion was built in Italian Renaissance style in the 1860s, by Amelie Elisabet Charlotta Piper (1836–1921) and her husband Member of Parliament and Foreign Minister, Carl Fredrik Hochschild (1831-1898).

See also
List of castles in Sweden

References

Manor houses in Sweden